John Fisher (1837 – 13 January 1927) was a member of the New Zealand Legislative Council from 14 July 1914 to 13 July 1921, when his term ended. He was appointed by the Reform Government.

Fisher was from Cambridge. He died at his home at Pukerimu, near Cambridge, on 13 January 1927.

References 

1837 births
1927 deaths
Members of the New Zealand Legislative Council
Reform Party (New Zealand) MLCs
People from Cambridge, New Zealand